Texila American University (TAU)  is an offshore private medical school, owned by the Texila American University Ltd – Hong Kong (TAU-HK). TAU-HK is a project of the ALLTERE Education Management Company. Texila's U.S. offices are in New Jersey. The University is located in Guyana, South America and offers undergraduate and postgraduate degrees in medicine, nursing, public health and allied sciences.

The school is registered with the National Accreditation Council of Guyana and received accreditation from the Caribbean Accreditation Authority for Education in Medicine and other Health Professions in 2023. It is listed in both FAIMERs and the World Directory of Medical Schools.

Management and Organization 
TAU was established in Guyana in September 2010 offering courses in medicine and dentistry. The initial classes ere offered at the Critchlow Labour College on Woolford Avenue in Georgetown, and in 2011, they moved to a campus in Goedverwagting, Sparendaam. In 2012, the university expanded its programs to offer nursing certifications. TAU graduated its first set doctors in 2014, followed by hundreds of graduate physicians in 2015, 2016 and 2017 out of a total enrollment of 422 students from 35 countries. In 2014, the school began an expansion hoping to accommodate up to 1000 students at a new campus located in Providence, East Bank Demerara.

Texila American University has a campus in Zambia and Fujairah in the United Arab Emirates.

Programs Offered

College of Medicine
Students also have the option of completing their training at independent facilities in Europe or Asia.

Completion of the full program will result in students receiving an MBBS for the pre-medical courses and the Doctor of Medicine degree for completion of the entire course. Options are available for students who have completed the pre-med elsewhere or have attained the equivalent of a BS and should contact the university for a determination.

College of Nursing
Nursing programs encompass a four-year program which is completed in 3 semesters per year. Subjects include biology and chemistry, as well as basic nursing and training in patient restorative care. The school utilizes both laboratory and technology-based education programs with students completing two years study on site at the Guyana campus and then completing two years of practicum in Canada, the United States, the United Kingdom, or other affiliated universities. Completion of the course will result in a Bachelor of Science in Nursing degree. Advanced classes for Registered nurse can be the undertaken in a 2-year RN-BSN program completed at the campus in Guyana.

Postgraduate Programs
Several postgraduate programs are also offered for students who have earned their bachelor's or other higher degrees. Fellowship programs vary and completion time will range from few months to one year. Masters and postgraduate programs are rendered in partnership with the Central University of Nicaragua.

Accreditation
Texila is registered with,  the National Accreditations Council of Guyana, Higher Education Authority, Ministry of Education, Guyana. It is listed in the FAIMER International Medical Education Directory (IMED) effective in 2011 as School #F0002428 and is listed in the World Health Organization's World Directory of Medical Schools. By virtue of its listing in IMED, students graduating from Texila are authorized to take part in the United States Medical Licensing Examination three-part examinations. Those who pass the examinations are eligible according to the Educational Commission for Foreign Medical Graduates to register for and participate in the National Resident Matching Program (NRMP). TAU received accreditation from the Caribbean Accreditation Authority for Education in Medicine and other Health Professions in 2023. Texila is also accredited by the Medical Council of India (MCI).

References

External links
School website

Medical schools in Guyana
Universities in Guyana
Buildings and structures in Georgetown, Guyana
2010 establishments in Guyana
Educational institutions established in 2010